Performative activism is activism done to increase one's social capital rather than because of one's devotion to a cause.

History and usage

Early uses of the term
The term appeared online in a 2015 article by Hyperallergic, but referred to the activism that involved an element of performance art. The article referenced the Greenham Common Women's Peace Camp, and how some women protested nuclear weapons by decorating a fence "with pictures, banners, and other objects," and added that "they blocked the road to the site with dance performances. They even climbed over the fence to dance in the forbidden zone."

In September 2018, Lou Constant-Desportes, the editor-in-chief of AFROPUNK.com resigned, citing "performative 'activism' dipped in consumerism and 'woke' keywords used for marketing purpose."

George Floyd protests and Black Lives Matter
On June 1, while expressing support for the Black Lives Matter movement in the wake of the George Floyd protests, singer Lorde stated, "One of the things I find most frustrating about social media is performative activism, predominantly by white celebrities (like me). It's hard to strike a balance between self-serving social media displays and true action."

On June 2, about 28 million Instagram users participated in the "Blackout Tuesday" movement, which involved users posting a completely blacked-out square image in order to show support of the George Floyd protests. Celebrities and general users alike received criticism by other social media users for engaging in "performative activism" via these Blackout Tuesday posts.

On June 5, Washington, D.C. mayor Muriel Bowser had the phrase Black Lives Matter painted on 16th Street in front of the White House. Bowser was criticized as an example of a government official creating a "performative distraction".

See also
Online shaming
Thoughts and prayers
Virtue signalling

References

Internet activism
Political terminology of the United States
Political terminology
Social justice terminology
Social commentary
Social influence
2010s neologisms
2020 in Internet culture